Roger Federer was the defending champion, but did not participate this year.

Gastón Gaudio won the tournament, beating Stanislas Wawrinka in the final, 6–4, 6–4.

Seeds

Draw

Finals

Top half

Bottom half

References

 Main Draw
 Qualifying Draw

Swiss Open (tennis)
2005 ATP Tour
2005 Allianz Suisse Open Gstaad